Joel Dalgarno (born July 5, 1987) is a Canadian lacrosse player. He was an All-American at the Ohio State University from 2006 to 2009, leading the Buckeyes to an NCAA Men's Lacrosse Championship tournament appearance in 2008. Dalgarno attended Western Reserve Academy as a prep star, and also starred in Canadian box lacrosse at the Junior A level. He was a two time All-American while at Ohio State.

Dalgarno was drafted 7th overall in the 2009 NLL draft by the Toronto Rock but before ever playing for the Rock, he was traded with Lewis Ratcliff and Tyler Codron to the Washington Stealth for Colin Doyle. Dalgarno played one season in Washington, collecting 16 points in 8 games. After appearing in two games during the 2011 season, Dalgarno was traded to the Colorado Mammoth along with Ian Hawskbee for Cliff Smith.

Statistics

NLL

Ohio State University

OLA/WLA/MSL Statistics

See also
 Maple Ridge Burrards

References

1987 births
Living people
Canadian lacrosse players
Ohio State Buckeyes men's lacrosse players
Colorado Mammoth players
People from Port Coquitlam
Sportspeople from British Columbia
Washington Stealth players
Western Reserve Academy alumni